Bryotropha rossica is a moth of the family Gelechiidae. It is found in southern Russia, Kazakhstan, north-western China and Estonia.

The wingspan is 12–13 mm. The forewings are mixed ochreous and greyish brown. The hindwings are pale ochreous brown, but darker towards the apex. Adults have been recorded on wing from May to July.

References

Moths described in 1996
rossica
Moths of Europe
Moths of Asia